On Stage is a double live album originally released by the British hard rock band Rainbow in 1977. It was recorded live over several German and Japanese dates in late 1976 during the Rising world tour. The album was released first in the US on 7 July 1977, before being released a week later on 15 July in the UK.

Recording
The recording features the customary introduction to a Rainbow show – the classic quote from The Wizard of Oz, "Toto: I have a feeling we're not in Kansas anymore. We must be over the rainbow!" with the last word repeated as an echo, then the actual band plays a musical phrase from the song "Over the Rainbow" before breaking into "Kill the King".

Many of the tracks were spliced together from different dates by producer Martin Birch, and the running order was changed to more easily fit four sides of vinyl.

Recording Sources:

Introduction/Kill The King
Nuremberg 28 September 1976 (first 1:03) 
Munich 29 September 1976 (remainder of the song) 

Man On The Silver Mountain
Tokyo 16 December 1976 (Afternoon Show) 

Blues
Tokyo 16 December 1976 (Evening Show) 

Starstruck
Tokyo 16 December 1976 (Evening Show) 

Man On The Silver Mountain (Reprise)
Tokyo 16 December 1976 (Afternoon Show) 

Catch The Rainbow
Osaka 9 December 1976 

Mistreated
Cologne 25 September 1976 

Sixteenth Century Greensleeves
Tokyo 16 December 1976 (Evening Show) 

Still I'm Sad
Nuremberg 28 September 1976

Release and reception

Geoff Ginsberg of AllMusic writes: "On Stage is full of great songs and playing, but somehow it lacks some of the excitement that existed at those early Ritchie Blackmore concerts. The production is just kind of flat. That doesn't change the fact that there is some great stuff to be found here and nowhere else, such as the side-long version of "Mistreated," from Deep Purple's Burn."

The song "Kill the King" appeared on this album before it was recorded for a studio album. A studio version appears on the follow-up release, 1978's Long Live Rock 'n' Roll.

The single "Kill the King/Man on the Silver Mountain/Mistreated" was released in the UK in September 1977. This was Rainbow's debut in the UK Singles Chart, peaking at No. 44. After the commercial success of "Since You Been Gone", "All Night Long" and "I Surrender", "Kill the King" was re-released in 1981 this time climbing to No. 41. Songwriter and lead singer Ronnie James Dio claimed that the violent imagery in the song is actually about a chess game.

A more representative example of a Rainbow concert of the time was the 1991 release Live in Germany 1976, which featured unedited concert performances and includes both tour staple "Stargazer" and the usual encore "Do You Close Your Eyes".

The deluxe edition was released on 13 November 2012 in Europe. The second disc was originally planned to contain tracks from the concert hall at the "Orix Theater" (formerly Osaka Kōsei Nenkin Kaikan) in Osaka, Japan (9 December 1976). Instead the second disc contains tracks from the final Rainbow gig in Tokyo, Japan at the "Nippon Budokan Hall" on 16 December 1976.

Track listing

Personnel
Rainbow
Ritchie Blackmore – guitar
Ronnie James Dio – vocals
Tony Carey – keyboards, Orchestron
Jimmy Bain – bass
Cozy Powell – drums

Charts 
 

Album

Singles

Certifications

References

Rainbow (rock band) live albums
1977 live albums
Polydor Records live albums
Albums produced by Martin Birch
Albums recorded at the Nippon Budokan